Árpád Plesch (1889–1974) was a Hungarian financier, banker, and lawyer. He owned a celebrated collection of rare botanical books and esoteric pornography.  His botanical collection has been included in  Douglas Cooper's Great Private Collections.

Plesch was mentor to the owner of the largest fortune in Italy, Gianni Agnelli, the president of Fiat.

He married three times, to:
 Léonie Caro Ulam  
 Marysia Ulam Krauss Harcourt-Smith, daughter of the previous
 Contessa Maria von Wurmbrand-Stuppach, called Etti Plesch, his last wife and sole heir to his immense fortune.

Léonie Ulam was the aunt of the mathematician Stanislaw Ulam. In his memoir, Adventures of a mathematician, Ulam wrote:

Publications 
 Botanique , 1954
 Essais d'acclimatation de plantes tropicales en France, 1962
 Mille et un livres botaniques de la collection Arpad Plesch, 1973

Notes 

20th-century Hungarian businesspeople
1889 births
1974 deaths
Owners of Prix de l'Arc de Triomphe winners